"Virgin's High!/Kicks!" is Mell's third single under Geneon Entertainment. "Virgin's high!" was used as the opening theme for the anime series Sky Girls. The single reached #15 in the Oricon charts and sold 19,800 copies. This is the first single wherein Kazuya Takase only composed and arranged one song for Mell.

Track listing 
Virgin's High! -- 4:21
Composition: Maiko Iuchi
Arrangement: Maiko Iuchi
Lyrics: Mell
Kicks! -- 3:48
Composition: Kazuya Takase
Arrangement: Kazuya Takase
Lyrics: Mell
Virgin's High! (instrumental) -- 4:21
Kicks! (instrumental) -- 3:46

References

2007 singles
Mell songs
Song recordings produced by I've Sound
2007 songs